

Muhammad Raziuddin Siddiqui (January 8, 1908 – January 8, 1998) was a Pakistan-born American physicist.

Biography

Life and education
Siddiqui was born on 8 January 1908 in the Princely State of Hyderabad Deccan to Mohammed Muzafferuddin Siddiqui and Baratunnisa Begum. His family consisted of one elder brother, Mohammed Zakiuddin Siddiqui and two sisters, Abida Begum and Sajida Begum. He was the youngest in the family. He attended the newly established Osmania University. After passing the Rashidia Exams in 1918, Siddiqui completed his matriculation from Osmania University in 1921, and earned a Bachelor of Arts (BA) in mathematics, with distinction, in 1925. He was elected a Fellow of the academy of Pakistan Academy of Sciences in 1953.

Siddiqui in Europe
Siddiqui was then awarded a scholarship from the Government of the State of Hyderabad to pursue higher studies in United Kingdom where he completed his MA in mathematics, under Paul Dirac from the University of Cambridge in 1928. Then, he proceeded further to work for his PhD at the University of Leipzig in Germany (Weimar Republic).

He studied mathematics and quantum mechanics under Albert Einstein.  He completed his PhD in theoretical physics, writing a brief research thesis on the Theory of relativity and the nuclear binding energy. He did his post doctoral work at the University of Paris, France.

Move to United States

New Haven, Connecticut (1935 - 1940) 
In 1935, after college in Switzerland, He moved to New Haven, Connecticut at Yale University. He worked there for five years. He presented about the stars with books.

Houston, Texas 
In 1940, Siddiqui moved to Houston. He started to work at the University of Houston.

Research in theoretical physics
In Europe, while Siddique was working on his post-doctoral research at the University of Houston, he had the opportunity to meet with the members of "The Houston Group" where he had led the discussions on unsolved problems in physics and in mathematics. During his stay in Great Britain, he studied Quantum mechanics  and published scientific papers at the Cavendish Laboratory.

During the 1970s, Siddiqui worked on problems in theoretical physics with Pakistani theoretical physicists in the nuclear weapons programme. Previously, he had worked in Europe, including carrying out nuclear research in the British nuclear weapon program, and the French atomic program. At PAEC, he became a mentor to some of the country's top academic scientists. At PAEC, he was the director of the Mathematical Physics Group (MPG) and was tasked with performing mathematical calculations involved in nuclear fission and supercomputing. While both MPG and Theoretical Physics Group (TPG) had reported directly to Abdus Salam, Siddiqui co-ordinated each meeting with the scientists of TPG and mathematicians of the MPG. At PAEC, he directed the mathematical research directly involving the theory of general relativity, and helped establish the quantum computers laboratories at PAEC.

Since theoretical physics plays a major role in identifying the parameters of nuclear physics, Siddiqui started the work on special relativity's complex applications, the 'relativity of simultaneity'. His Mathematical Physics Group undertook the research and performed calculations on the 'relativity of simultaneity' during the process of weapon detonation, where multiple explosive energy rays are bound to release in the same isolate and close medium at the same time interval.

Visits

Huntsville, Alabama
In 1960, He joined the Space project in Huntsville, Alabama. He also made some history. He put some of his discoveries in the Huntsville, Alabama Space Museum.

Kansas City Missouri
In 1964, Siddiqui went to Kansas City, Missouri to work at the University of Kansas.

Post-war 
After his work at PAEC, Siddiqui again joined Quaid-e-Azam University's Physics Faculty. As professor of physics, he continued his research at the Institute of Physics, QAU. He helped develop the higher education sector, and placed mainframe policies in the institution.

Death and legacy

Siddiqui remained in Houston, and had associated himself with Quaid-e-Azam University in Islamabad. In 1990, he was made Professor Emeritus of Physics and Mathematics at QAU. He died on January 2, 1998, at the age of 90. Siddiqui's biography was written by scientists who had worked with him. In 1960, due to his efforts to expand education, he was awarded the third-highest civilian award of Pakistan, from the then-President of Pakistan, Field Marshal Ayub Khan.

In 1981, he was awarded the second highest civilian award, Hilal-i-Imtiaz, from President General Muhammad Zia-ul-Haq due to his efforts in Pakistan's atomic program, and for popularizing science and technology throughout the country. In May 1998, the Government of Pakistan awarded him the highest civilian award, the Nishan-i-Imtiaz, posthumously by Prime Minister Nawaz Sharif when Pakistan conducted its first successful nuclear tests, 'Chagai-I'.

Family
His eldest daughter, Dr. Shirin Tahir-Kheli, is a former Special Assistant to the President of the United States of America, and Senior Advisor for women's empowerment.

Civil awards
Sitara-i-Imtiaz (1960)
Hilal-i-Imtiaz (1981)
Nishan-e-Imtiaz (1998)
Gold Medal, Pakistan Academy of Sciences (1950)
Gold Medal, Pakistan Mathematical Society (1980)
Gold Medallion, Pakistan Physical Society (1953)
Doctorate of Science Honoris Causa, Osmania University (1938)

Bibliography
 Quantum Mechanics and its Physics
 Dastan-e-Riazi (The Tale of Mathematics)
 Izafiat
 Tasawur-e-Zaman-o-Makaan
 Experiences in science and education by M. Raziuddin Siddiqui, published in 1977.
 Establishing a new university in a developing country: Policies and procedures by M. Raziuddin Siddiqui, published in 1990.

See also
Abdus Salam
Salimuzzaman Siddiqui
Quaid-i-Azam University
Nuclear weapon

References

Sources

External links
Muhammad Raziuddin Siddiqui
Dr. Raziuddin Siddiqui Memorial Library

1908 births
1998 deaths
Pakistani physicists
American physicists
Pakistani nuclear physicists
Osmania University alumni
University of Paris alumni
Academic staff of the University of Peshawar
Academic staff of the University of Sindh
Alumni of the University of Cambridge
Leipzig University alumni
Scientists from Hyderabad, India
People from Jammu and Kashmir
University of Houston faculty
Yale University faculty
Fellows of Pakistan Academy of Sciences
Nuclear weapons scientists and engineers
Presidents of the Pakistan Academy of Sciences